David V. Jennings (January 19, 1887 – November 27, 1970) was a member of the Wisconsin State Assembly from 1912 to 1914 and the Wisconsin State Senate from 1914 to 1921.

Biography
David V. Jennings was born in Keshena, Wisconsin in 1887. He moved to Milwaukee, Wisconsin in 1900. He graduated from Marquette Academy in 1904. Later, he attended Marquette University from 1904 to 1907. He graduated from Marquette University Law School in 1911 with a legal degree.

Career
Jennings was elected to the Wisconsin State Assembly in 1912 and to the 9th District of the Wisconsin State Senate in 1914 as a Democrat. He served in the state senate until 1921. He also served as chief examiner for the Milwaukee County civil service commission, holding that position from January 1, 1918 until his resignation on January 27, 1948.

References

People from Keshena, Wisconsin
Politicians from Milwaukee
Democratic Party Wisconsin state senators
Democratic Party members of the Wisconsin State Assembly
Marquette University alumni
Marquette University Law School alumni
1887 births
1970 deaths
20th-century American politicians